Vanemerak is a surname. Notable people with the surname include:

Mario Vanemerak (born 1963), Argentine footballer and manager
Oscar Vanemerak (born 1989), Argentine footballer